The 217th New Jersey Legislature began on January 12, 2016 and ended on January 9, 2018, in the last two years of the Governorship of Chris Christie.

Background 
The elections for the Assembly were held on November 3, 2015, while elections for the Senate, and Assembly were held on November 5, 2013 alongside the 2013 New Jersey gubernatorial election. In the 2015 Assembly elections Democrats gained four seats in the assembly giving them over 50 seats in the Assembly. The incumbents that lost re-election were Sam Fiocchi, Mary Pat Angelini, Caroline Casagrande, and Donna Simon.

Party composition

Assembly

Senate

Leadership

Senate

Assembly 
Speaker: Vincent Prieto

Majority Leader: Louis Greenwald

Minority Leader: Jon Bramnick

Members

Senate 
The Senate has 40 members, one for each district.

† First appointed to the seat

Former members from this term

1 O'Toole had previously served in the Senate from 2001 to 2002

Committees and Committee Chairs, 2016-2017 Legislative Session
Committee chairs are: (All are Democrats)

Assembly 
The Assembly has 80 members, two for each district.

Former members from this term

Vacancies

Senate

Assembly

See also
 List of New Jersey state legislatures

Notes

References 

New Jersey Legislature
New Jersey General Assembly by session